The Latimers : A Tale of the Western Insurrection of 1794 is an historical novel by the American writer and Presbyterian clergyman  Henry Christopher McCook (1837–1911) set in 1790s Pittsburgh, Pennsylvania.

The novel tells the story of Scotch-Irish American pioneers during the Whiskey Rebellion.

See also

Other novels that employ events of the Whiskey Rebellion:
 The Whiskey Rebels (2008)
 Wilderness Boy (1955)
 The Delectable Country (1939)

References

External links
The Latimers : A Tale of the Western Insurrection of 1794 (1898) (Historic Pittsburgh e-text)

1898 American novels
Novels set in Pittsburgh
Scotch-Irish American culture in Pennsylvania
Fiction set in the 1790s